A cubic metre per second (m3s−1, m3/s, cumecs or cubic meter per second in American English) is the unit of volumetric flow rate in the International System of Units (SI) equal to that of a stere or cube with sides of  in length exchanged or moving each second. It is popularly used for water flow, especially in rivers and streams, and fractions for HVAC values measuring air flow.

The term cumec is also used, as shorthand for "Cubic metres per second", with the plural form cumecs also common in speech. It is commonly used between workers in the measurement of water flow through natural streams and civil works, but rarely used in writing.  Data in units of cumec are used along the y-axis or vertical axis of a flow hydrograph, which describes the time variation of discharge of a river (the mean velocity multiplied by cross-sectional area).  A moderately sized river discharges in the order of 100 cumecs.

Conversions

References

See also
 Standard litre per minute
 Conversion of units
 Volumetric flow rate
 Volumetric flux
 Cusec, shorthand for cubic feet per second

Units of flow
SI derived units